Pralormo is a comune (municipality) in the Metropolitan City of Turin in the Italian region Piedmont, about 25 km southeast of Turin. 

Pralormo borders the following municipalities: Poirino, Cellarengo, Montà, Ceresole Alba, Santo Stefano Roero, and Monteu Roero.

References

Cities and towns in Piedmont